Michael Herman may refer to:

Michael Herman (intelligence officer) (1929–2021), British intelligence officer for GCHQ and academic
Michael Herman (mathematician) (1942–2000), French American mathematician
Michael E. Herman (born 1943), president of the Kansas City Royals, 1992–2000